Elizabeth "Betty" Emry (January 20, 1923 – April 18, 1995) was an infielder and pitcher who played in the All-American Girls Professional Baseball League.

A member of a championship team, Emry filled in at infield and pitched during her two-year stint in the All-American Girls Professional Baseball League.

Born in Manistique, Michigan, Emry played for the Keller Girls softball team in Detroit before joining the league with the Racine Belles in the 1945 season.

She started her career at shortstop, but was converted to a pitcher because of her strong throwing arm. She then posted a 7–4 record and a 2.15 earned run average in 15 games for the 1946 Belles champion team, even though she was still hampered by a knee injury. She also allowed three unearned runs in four innings of a postseason game, but did not have a decision.

After baseball, Emry went to work at Briggs Aircraft plant close to end of World War II.

She is part of Women in Baseball, a permanent display based at the Baseball Hall of Fame and Museum in Cooperstown, New York, which was unveiled in 1988 to honor the entire All-American Girls Professional Baseball League.

Emry died in New Port Richey, Florida, at the age of 73.

Career statistics
Batting 

Pitching

Fielding

Sources

All-American Girls Professional Baseball League players
Racine Belles (1943–1950) players
Baseball players from Michigan
People from New Port Richey, Florida
People from Schoolcraft County, Michigan
1923 births
1995 deaths
20th-century American women
20th-century American people